Srl CILFIT v Ministry of Health (1982) Case 283/81 is an EU law case, concerning preliminary references to the Court of Justice of the European Union.

Facts
CILFIT, a wool importer, contested the amount it had paid by way of fixed health
inspection levy. Appeals by CILFIT were denied, and the case reached
the Court of Cassation. In the Court of Cassation, the Ministry of Health argued that
the factual circumstances of the case were so obvious as to rule out any other
possible interpretation, so there would not be a need for a preliminary ruling.
The Court of Cassation then referred the case to Court of Justice.

Judgment
The Court of Justice held that a national court of last instance is under no obligation to refer when the issue is acte clair or when the ECJ has already ruled on the question of interpretation referred by the national court. It said there is no need to refer if there is already a judgment, and continued.

Significance 

CILFIT case is famous for two things: reaffirming the principle that EU law must be interpreted in its context and with the goals of EU Law in mind, and establishing criteria when a preliminary ruling from EU court does not need to be requested.

See also

European Union law

Notes

External links

Court of Justice of the European Union case law
1982 in case law